Palpita oblita is a moth in the family Crambidae. It is found in India (Darjeeling).

References

Moths described in 1888
Palpita
Moths of Asia